Frank Sturing (born 29 May 1997) is a Canadian professional soccer player who plays as a centre-back for SV Horn in the 2. Liga and the Canada national team.

Club career

NEC
Sturing started playing soccer in Nijmegen in 2007 with NEC's academy. On 2 April 2017, he made his debut for NEC against Vitesse. In May 2020, NEC announced Sturing would be departing the club.

Den Bosch
In October 2020, Sturing joined rival Dutch second-tier club Den Bosch. At the end of the 2020–21 Eerste Divisie, Sturing departed the club.

SV Horn
In September 2021 Sturing joined Austrian club SV Horn. In April 2022, Horn announced Sturing has been signed to a new deal through the summer of 2023.

International career

Netherlands
Sturing has represented the Netherlands at multiple youth levels.

Canada
Eligible for Canada through his father, Sturing was named to the Canadian U-23 provisional roster for the 2020 CONCACAF Men's Olympic Qualifying Championship on 26 February 2020. He accepted an invite for the Canadian senior national team camp for January 2021. He joined the World Cup qualifier squad in March 2021, and started in the game against Cayman Islands on the 29th; he scored the match's opening goal, his first for Canada.

On July 11, Canada Soccer announced that Sturing would join the 2021 CONCACAF Gold Cup squad after Scott Kennedy withdrew from the team.

International goal
Scores and results list Canada's goal tally first.

References

External links
 
 

1997 births
Canadian people of Dutch descent
Dutch people of Canadian descent
Living people
Footballers from Nijmegen
Association football defenders
Canadian soccer players
Canada men's international soccer players
Dutch footballers
Netherlands youth international footballers
NEC Nijmegen players
FC Den Bosch players
SV Horn players
Eredivisie players
Eerste Divisie players
2. Liga (Austria) players
Canadian expatriate soccer players
Expatriate footballers in Austria
Dutch expatriate sportspeople in Austria
Canadian expatriate sportspeople in Austria
Dutch expatriate footballers